The 2010 WNBL Finals was the postseason tournament of the WNBL's 2009–10 season. The Canberra Capitals were the defending champions and they successfully defended their title with a 75–70 win over the Bulleen Boomers in the Grand Final.

Standings

Bracket
<onlyinclude>

Elimination final

(4) Townsville Fire vs. (5) Bendigo Spirit

Semi-finals

(1) Bulleen Boomers vs. (2) Sydney Uni Flames

(3) Canberra Capitals vs. (4) Townsville Fire

Preliminary final

(2) Sydney Uni Flames vs. (3) Canberra Capitals

Grand Final

(1) Bulleen Boomers vs. (3) Canberra Capitals

Rosters

References 

2010 Finals
2009-10
Women's National Basketball League Finals
2009–10 in Australian basketball
Aus
basketball
basketball